Les Insomniaques s'amusent is the first album by Québécois singer and musician Daniel Bélanger.

Track listing
La folie en quatre - 3:55
Ensorcelée - 4:12
Sèche tes pleurs - 2:38
Désespéré - 4:37
Ma dépendance - 3:27
Opium - 4:39
Quand le jour se lève - 4:16
Le bonheur - 4:38
Jamais les heures - 4:13
Mon retour - 3:59
L'Autruche - 2:21

Credits
Produced by Rick Haworth at Studio Piccolo
Track 1 produced by Sylvain Lefebvre at Studio La Majeure
Track 3 produced by Paul Pagé at Studio Saint-Charles
Tracks 6 and 8 produced by Paul Pagé at Studio Saint-Charles and Studio Piccolo
Tracks 5, 7 and 10 produced by Rick Haworth at Studio Victor and Studio Piccolo
Assistant producer for tracks 6 and 8: Rick Haworth
Mixed by Glen Robinson at Studio Morin Heights 
Mixing assistant: Rick Haworth
Track 1 mixed by Paul Pagé at Studio Saint-Charles
Mastered by Howie Winburg at Masterdisk, New York City
Additional mastering by Bill Kipper at SNB Mastering, Montreal
A&R: Michel Bélanger
Sleeve designer: Anne Thomas Designer/Benoît Lagacé
Front cover photo designer: Lyne Charlebois, David Franco
Front cover photo: Jean-François Gratton

1992 debut albums
Daniel Bélanger albums
Audiogram (label) albums